Wonoboyo hoard is an important archaeological find of golden and silver artifacts from the 9th century Mataram Kingdom in Central Java, Indonesia. It was discovered in October 1990 in Plosokuning hamlet, Wonoboyo village, Klaten, Central Java, near Prambanan.

Discovery
The hoard was discovered on 17 October 1990 in Plosokuning hamlet, Wonoboyo village, Klaten, Central Java, when a paddy field owned by Mrs. Cipto Suwarno was being dug by Witomoharjo and five other workers as part of an irrigation project. After digging down 2.5 metres, Witomoharjo hit a hard surface that he thought was a stone. However, after digging further they unearthed three large terracotta jars containing large numbers of coins and amounts of gold artifacts. The discovery was reported to village authorities, and reached the attention of the Culture and Education Authority.

The treasure

The total weight of treasure was 16.9 kilograms of valuable artifacts, of which 14.9 kilograms were gold and 2 kilograms silver. It consists of more than 1,000 ceremonial objects, including:
 a bulbous golden bowl carved with Ramayana scene
 a Ramayana carved golden wide-sided bowl. ("Bokor emas berhias relief cerita Ramayana" in Indonesian) This artifact has been identified as one of the cultural properties of Indonesia in 2013.
 6 golden lids
 3 golden water dippers
 1 tray
 97 golden arm bracelets
 22 small bowls
 a pipe
 a large Tang dynasty terracotta jar as the container 
 2 smaller jars
 11 golden rings
 7 plates
 8 golden earrings
 a golden handbag
 a golden keris handle or probably a parasol golden tip ornament
 some beads
 some cornseed-like golden coins 

In addition to the above artifacts there were more than 6,000 gold and silver coins.

The Wonoboyo hoard is displayed in Treasure Room in National Museum of Indonesia, Jakarta, and a replica of the treasure is on display at the Prambanan museum. The hoard has also been exhibited in Australia.

The Wonoboyo hoard  is one of the most important archaeological findings in Indonesia. Next to the high value of the gold and silver artifacts, it also a significant to reveal the wealth, economy, art and culture of 9th century Javanese Mataram Kingdom. The artifacts shows the intricate artworks, also displays the aesthetic and technical mastery of ancient Java goldsmith. On the surface of the gold coins engraved with a script "ta", a short form of "tail" or "tahil" a unit of currency in ancient Java. Also revealed the scripts "Saragi Diah Bunga" engraved in one of the treasure written in Kawi language, which probably was the name of the owner. The hoard was estimated dated from the reign of King Balitung (899–911). The treasure has been identified as belonging to a noble or the member of royal family.

References

Further reading
  Miksic, John N. Old Javanese gold  Singapore : Ideation, c1990.

External links 
  Tempo: Warisan Saragi Diah Bunga 

Archaeology of Indonesia
Mataram Kingdom
1990 in Indonesia
Gold objects
Treasure troves of Asia
National Museum of Indonesia